Stomp the Yard is the soundtrack to the 2007 film, Stomp the Yard. It was released on April 24, 2007, through Artists' Addiction Records and peaked at 20 on the Billboard charts' Top Soundtracks.

Track listing
"Go Hard or Go Home" - E-40 featuring The Federation
"Vans" - The Pack
"Poppin'" - Chris Brown
"Sign Me Up" - Ne-Yo
"The Champ" - Ghostface Killah
"Walk It Out" - DJ Unk
"Pop, Lock, and Drop It" - Huey
"The Deepest Hood" - Al Kapone
"Come On" - Bonecrusher featuring Onslaught
"Superman's Black In The Building" - Public Enemy
"Storm" - Cut Chemist featuring Mr. Lif & Edan
"In the Music" - The Roots featuring Malik B & Porn
"Ain't Nothing Wrong with That" - Robert Randolph & The Family Band
"Bounce Wit Me" - R.E.D. 44
Ying Yang Twins ft. Pitbull - Shake

References

Drama film soundtracks
Hip hop soundtracks
2007 soundtrack albums